Robert L. Cook (December 10, 1952) is a computer graphics researcher and developer, and the co-creator of the RenderMan rendering software. His contributions are considered to be highly influential in the field of animated arts.

In 2009, Cook was elected a member of the National Academy of Engineering for building the motion picture industry's standard rendering tool.

Cook was born in Knoxville, Tennessee and educated at Duke University and Cornell University. While at Cornell, Cook worked with Donald P. Greenberg.

Education
B.S. in physics, 1973, Duke University, N.C.
M.S. in computer graphics, 1981, Cornell University, Ithaca, N.Y.

Career

Robert Cook was involved with Lucasfilm and later had the position as Vice President of Software Development at Pixar Animation Studios, which he left in 1989. In November 2016, he became the Commissioner of the Technology Transformation Service of the U.S. General Services Administration.

Computer Animation Rendering
 Star Trek II: The Wrath of Khan (1982) computer graphics: Industrial Light & Magic
 André and Wally B. (1984) 3D rendering
 Luxo, Jr. (1986) rendering
 Red's Dream (1987) reyes / miracle tilt
 Toy Story (1995) renderman software development
 Toy Story 2 (1999) rendering software engineer
 Monsters, Inc. (2001) software team lead
 Cars (2006) software team lead
 Up (2009) software development: Pixar studio team

Awards
 1987, ACM SIGGRAPH Achievement Award in recognition of his contributions to the fields of computer graphics and visual effects.
 1992, Scientific and Engineering Award for the development of "RenderMan" software which produces images used in motion pictures from 3D computer descriptions of shape and appearance.
 1999, Fellow of the Association for Computing Machinery.
 2000, Academy Award of Merit (Oscar) for significant advancements to the field of motion picture rendering as exemplified in Pixar's RenderMan. Their broad professional influence in the industry continues to inspire and contribute to the advancement of computer-generated imagery for motion pictures.
 GATF InterTech Award
 MacWorld World Class Award
 Seybold Award for Excellence
 2009, The Steven Anson Coons Award for Outstanding Creative Contributions to Computer Graphics
 2009, Elected to the National Academy of Engineering

References

1952 births
Living people
American animators
American computer scientists
American physicists
Computer graphics professionals
Cornell University alumni
Duke University alumni
People from Knoxville, Tennessee
Fellows of the Association for Computing Machinery
Members of the United States National Academy of Engineering
Lucasfilm people
Pixar people